Psorosa tergestella is a species of snout moth. It is found in Italy and Croatia.

The wingspan is about 18 mm.

References

Moths described in 1901
Phycitini
Moths of Europe